Charles Ian Squires (born 22 April 1951) is a British television producer, and the former Head of ITV Regions.

Early life
He comes from Sunderland, where he was born. He attended Bede Grammar School for Boys. From 1969 to 1972 he completed a BA in English at UCL.

Career
From 1973 to 1975 he worked as a journalist in parliament.

BBC
From 1975 to 1986 he worked at the BBC in current affairs and on Omnibus. From 1986 to 1988 he was a freelance television producer. In 1988 he became Head of Network Television for BBC North West.

Central Broadcasting
In 1994 he moved to Carlton Studios, Nottingham (Lenton Lane Studios), becoming the managing director of Central Broadcasting, later Carlton Broadcasting from 1999. In early September 1999, the Central Television name disappeared. On 27 February 2004 he told staff at the Lenton Lane Studios in Nottingham, that the site was closing down, with the loss of around 200 jobs. Central employed around 700 people. Central News East would be moved to Birmingham.

ITV
In 2004 he became managing director of ITV Central. In 2009 he became Controller of ITV Regions.

Personal life
He married Vanessa Sweet in October 1993 in Truro. They have two daughters (born July 1996 and August 1999). He lives at Bisbrooke in Rutland. He has previously lived in Burrough on the Hill.

References

External links
 ITV History

1951 births
Alumni of University College London
BBC executives
BBC television producers
British television executives
ITV people
Mass media in the East Midlands
People educated at Bede Grammar School for Boys
People from the Borough of Melton
People from Rutland
People from Sunderland
Living people